Jillian Mary "Jill" Camarena-Williams (born March 2, 1982) is an American retired track and field athlete who competes in the shot put. She competed at the 2012 and 2008 Beijing Olympics and has represented the United States both indoor and outdoors at World Championship-level.

She took back-to-back titles in the shot put at the Pan American Junior Championships in 1999 and 2001. Domestically, she is a two-time USA Outdoor Champion in the shot put, having won in 2006 and 2010. Camarena-Williams set an American indoor record in the shot put to win at the 2011 USA Indoor Track and Field Championships, recording a mark of 19.87 meters to improve upon Ramona Pagel's record which had stood since 1987.

Born in Woodland, California, she is listed at 5 foot 10 inches tall and 250 lbs. She did her undergraduate work at Stanford University and graduate studies at Brigham Young University.  She is a Latter-day Saint. Camarena-Williams married her physiotherapist, Dustin Williams, in 2010. On July 29, 2016 - Camarena-Williams announced the four city team challenge at Track Town, USA in Eugene, Oregon on ESPN was her final competition.

Doping ban
In October 2013, Camarena-Williams was hit with a six-month suspension from the US Anti-Doping Agency after testing positive for clomiphene. The substance was discovered in an out-of-competition test conducted on July 1. The  punishment was implemented retrospectively, meaning she was cleared to compete again on January 1, 2014.

Achievements

References

External links
 
 
 
 
 
 

1982 births
Living people
Track and field athletes from California
People from Woodland, California
Sportspeople from Greater Sacramento
American female shot putters
Olympic track and field athletes of the United States
Athletes (track and field) at the 2008 Summer Olympics
Athletes (track and field) at the 2012 Summer Olympics
Pan American Games track and field athletes for the United States
Pan American Games medalists in athletics (track and field)
Athletes (track and field) at the 2015 Pan American Games
World Athletics Championships athletes for the United States
World Athletics Championships medalists
American sportspeople in doping cases
Doping cases in athletics
Latter Day Saints from California
Stanford University alumni
Brigham Young University alumni
Pan American Games silver medalists for the United States
USA Outdoor Track and Field Championships winners
USA Indoor Track and Field Championships winners
Medalists at the 2015 Pan American Games